Baseg is a rural locality (a settlement) in Gubakha Urban Okrug, Perm Krai, Russia. The population was 14 as of 2010.

References 

Rural localities in Perm Krai
Gubakha Urban Okrug